Joëlle Leuchter (born 8 September 1982) is a Luxembourger former footballer who played as a midfielder. She has been a member of the Luxembourg women's national team.

References

1982 births
Living people
Women's association football midfielders
Luxembourgian women's footballers
Luxembourg women's international footballers